Parascombrops spinosus, the keelcheek bass, is a species of fish in the family Acropomatidae, the lanternbellies. It is native to the western Atlantic Ocean from Canada to Uruguay.

References

spinosus
Fish described in 1940
Taxobox binomials not recognized by IUCN